In finance, a buyout is an investment transaction by which the ownership equity of a company, or a majority share of the stock of the company is acquired. The acquiror thereby "buys out" the present equity holders of the target company. A buyout will often include the purchasing of the target company's outstanding debt, which is referred to as "assumed debt" by the purchaser.

Non-finance usage
The term may apply more generally to the purchase by one party of all of the rights of another party with respect to an ongoing transaction between the two. For example:
An employer may "buy out" an employee's contract by making a single prepayment, so as to have no ongoing obligation to employ the person;
A landlord may buy out the remainder of a tenant's lease, effectively paying them to vacate.
A government may buy out homes in a floodplain or other area subject to hazard. The language used by FEMA, a United States agency, is "acquisition".
In Major League Baseball, a club option is an optional year at the end of the ballplayer's contract that may be guaranteed at the discretion of the team. Usually, the option comes with a "buyout" which represents a fraction of the value of the option. If at the time that the club is in a position to exercise its option and the team decides not to exercise the option, the team will usually pay the buyout and decline the option. Generally, this results in the ballplayer becoming eligible to be a free agent. Alternatively, if the contract turned one of the ballplayer's arbitration-eligible seasons into an option season, the team can decline the option with the ballplayer then entering the arbitration process instead.
In real estate, a landlord has the opportunity to buy out their tenant on a mutually agreed upon price. Most of the time, landlords use buyouts to remove rent-stabilized tenants and move in a tenant who will pay a higher rent. This type of buyout can create benefits for both parties.

See also

Buyout clause
Employee buyout
Leveraged buyout
Management buyout
Mergers and acquisitions
Stub (stock)
Takeover

Notes and references 

Corporate finance
Stock market